Rustum is a 2019 Indian Kannada-language action crime film directed by Ravi Varma in his directorial debut. It was produced by Jayanna and Bhogendra under the banner of Jayanna Combines. The film features Shiva Rajkumar, Vivek Oberoi, Shraddha Srinath, Rachita Ram and Mayuri Kyatari in the lead roles.

The film was the Kannada film debut of Vivek Oberoi, Mahendran , Harish Uthaman and Sakshi Chaudhary. This is the first Kannada film to be set in Bihar for a large part of the film. The film was also noted to have a large portion of the second half of the film in Hindi language. A sequel to the film was announced after the movie became a commercial success.

Plot 
IAS officer Subhakar Deshpande is missing under mysterious circumstances. His father, who is a headmaster files a complaint to the police, only for some henchman to threaten him to withdraw the complaint and hand over some evidence to them. Abhi is their new neighbour, who lives with his wife Anjana aka Anju along with his sister Ammu and little daughter Putti. He learns of their situation and decide to support him. Meanwhile, Home Minister Durga Prasad is planning to make his second son Aadhi Prasad to stand for nomination in elections and it is revealed that Aadhi is behind Subhakar's disappearance and is pressuring Subhakar's father for the evidence. He learns of Abhi supporting Subhakar's father to pressurise the department to find Subhakar. Aadhi kidnaps Ammu from a theatre where Abhi tries to chases them. He loses their sight, but notes down their car number.

With the help of Sub-Inspector Kiran Kumar, he tracks the car's owner, who is actually Durga Prasad's first son Arjun Prasad. Kiran arrest Arjun Prasad in order to force him to surrender Aadhi, but is saved by the Commissioner where he suspends Kiran and detains Abhi in the station. Enraged about Arjun's arrest, Durga Prasad asks Bunty Yadav to deal with Abhi. When Bunty arrives and is about to kill him. Abhi fights back, where Bunty gets frightened after seeing Abhi. It is revealed that Abhi is actually Assistant Commissioner of Police Abhishek Bhargav aka Rustum. He is known to be merciless where he kills the criminals in a Police encounter. He relocates with his family to Patna as he received a transfer order where he meets his best friend Bharath Raj, who is Deputy Commissioner of Police settled in Patna, along with his wife Rachu and sister Ammu, who is completing her IAS training.

Meanwhile, Abhi investigates about a missing child where he learns that Bunty Yadav is actually indulging in child trafficking. Abhi tracks Bunty at his hideout where he kills the henchman and is about to kill Bunty, but Bharath and his team arrive and prevents Abhi from doing so. Abhi thrashes an Member of Legislative Assembly named Sundar Pandey at the police station, when he tries to pressurise Bharath to release Bunty. Due to this, Abhi is suspended for where he, along with his family leave for a break. After learning from Ammu about child beggars increasing in the city due to their organs are removed. Bharath interrogates Bunty where he learns that Durga Prasad and Arjun Prasad are involved in illegal organ trading. With the help of Subhakar, Bharat conducts a sting operation at PARKWEST HOSPITAL in Goa (which is actually founded by Durga Prasad) and collects enough evidence  to arrest them for their illegal activities.

Bharath heads to Patna to arrest the Durga Prasad's henchmen involved in organ trading. Durga Prasad, along with Arjun Prasad arrive and reveals that they killed Subhakar and buried him in a construction site. Arjun blackmails Bharath by holding Rachu at gunpoint, Realizing that she will be burden for Bharath's honesty. Rachu kills herself in front of Bharath. Enraged, Bharath tries to kill them, but gets shot and killed and frames it as a gang-war. Ammu and Abhi get devastated about Bharath's death where Ammu tries to commit suicide, but is saved by Abhi where he assures that Bharath's death will be avenged. Abhi investigates the incident where he deduce a mole in the department, who is Inspector Yadav where he corces to shoot himself. Yadav kills himself and Abhi goes undercover to investigate Durga Prasad's involvement in organ trading. Abhi gets back on duty where he collects evidence from Subhakar's parents and also kills Aadhi, by telling Ammu to shoot him. Abhi raids Durga Prasad's warehouses, companies and hospital. Abhi is taken to Durga Prasad where he battles with them and their henchman. Durga Prasad and Arjun Prasad are killed by Ammu, thus avenging Bharath's death.

Cast
 Shiva Rajkumar as ACP Abhishek Bhargav (Abhi) aka Rustum
 Vivek Oberoi as DCP Bharath Raj 
 Shraddha Srinath as Anjana aka Anju
 Rachita Ram as Rachana aka Rachu 
 Mayuri Kyatari as Ammu
 Mahendran as Durga Prasad
 Harish Uthaman as Arjun Prasad 
 Arjun Gowda as Aadi Prasad
 RJ Rohith as Inspector Kiran 
 Shatru as Bunty Yadav
 Shivraj K R Pete as PC Shivu
 Sakshi Chaudhary in an item number Singaravva

Production 

Vivek Oberoi lent the voice himself.

Music

Release 
The movie was released on 28 June 2019

Critical Reception
The film received mixed reviews from both critics and audience alike. Times of India rated 3/5. The News Minute also gave 3/5 and stated , " Shivarajkumar's cop film is a predictable, fan-pleasing effort. The film reminds one of many other cop films but Shivanna fans are likely to be pleased by his "mass" role.". The Indian Express gave 1/5 and stated , " This Shivrajkumar film is a joke. It seems like the filmmakers tried to pull out a narrative out of thin air after going to the sets. In fact, put a bunch of toddlers in a room and ask them to come up with a story, it will still be a better film than what Ravi Varma and his team have created.".

Accolades
In 9th South Indian International Movie Awards movie got 2 nominations.
 Best Debut Director - Ravivarma 
 Best Cinematographer - Mahen Simha

References

External links 
 

Indian crime action films
2019 directorial debut films
2019 films
2019 crime action films
2010s Kannada-language films
Films scored by Anoop Seelin
2019 masala films
Indian crime thriller films
Indian action thriller films
2019 action thriller films
2019 crime thriller films
Films set in Bihar